Sequana  Joi Harris (December 11, 1976 – August 14, 2017) was an American motorcycle road racer and stuntwoman. She was the first African American woman licensed as a motorcycle road racer, racing professionally since 2014, while beginning motorcycling in 2009. She was killed while filming a motorcycle stunt, doubling as "Domino" on the set of Deadpool 2, when the bike she was riding crashed near the Shaw Tower.

Racing career
Harris promoted road racing to women and also the African American community. She learned how to ride a motorcycle in 2009. She started racing in 2012 and gained her racing license in 2013. She started racing professionally in 2014, becoming the first African American woman in motorcycle road racing to ever do so. She then set up her own racing team, Threader Racing, racing as #24. 

In 2017, she raced in the NJMP and SPR classes on the CCS circuit of ASRA where she had a win on the 2017 circuit.

Death
Harris was on her first shoot as a stuntwoman, performing  for Deadpool 2, in 2017. On August 14, 2017, during filming, Harris was riding without a helmet in downtown Vancouver when she lost control of her bike, hit a curb, and was thrown into the Shaw Tower. She had been doubling for actress Zazie Beetz, playing Domino in Deadpool 2, and died on the scene. This marked the second death in two months of a stunt performer in North America, following the July death of stuntman John Bernecker on the set of The Walking Dead TV series. Deadpool 2 was dedicated to Harris.

References

Further reading

External links
 
 

1976 births
2017 deaths
Female motorcycle racers
American motorcycle racers
African-American sportswomen
African-American actresses
American actresses
American stunt performers
Motorcycle road incident deaths
Road incident deaths in Canada
20th-century African-American sportspeople
21st-century African-American sportspeople
20th-century African-American women
21st-century African-American women
People from Brooklyn